Yeşilova is a village in the Gölbaşı District, Adıyaman Province, Turkey. Its population is 571 (2021).

References 

Villages in Gölbaşı District, Adıyaman Province